Tenor Stuff is an album recorded in 1961 by Paul Gonsalves and Harold Ashby.

Track listing 
"You Came Along from Out of Nowhere"
"Swallowing the Blues"
"London Broil"
"Midnight Sun"
"Squeeze Me"
"Jeeps Blues"
"You Can Depend on Me"

Performers 
Paul Gonsalves - Tenor Saxophone / Guitar
Harold Ashby - Tenor Saxophone 
Ray Nance - trumpet, violin and vocals 
Sir Charles Thompson - Piano 
Aaron Bell - Bass 
Jo Jones - drums

References 

1961 albums
Paul Gonsalves albums
Columbia Records albums